Little Giants is a 1994 American family sports comedy film directed by Duwayne Dunham. The film stars Rick Moranis and Ed O'Neill as Danny and Kevin O'Shea, two brothers living in a small Ohio town who coach rival Pee-Wee Football teams. The film was produced by Amblin Entertainment and distributed by Warner Bros. under the Warner Bros. Family Entertainment label.

Plot
Danny O'Shea has always lived in the shadow of his older brother, Kevin, a Heisman Trophy winner and local football hero. They live in their hometown of Urbana, Ohio. Kevin coaches the local "Pee-Wee Cowboys" football team.  Despite being the best player, Danny's tomboy daughter, Becky, nicknamed Icebox, is cut during try outs solely because she is a girl. Also cut are her less-talented friends, Rashid Hanon (who can't catch anything), Tad Simpson (who is a poor runner), and Rudy Zolteck (who's overweight and quite flatulent). After being ridiculed by the players who made the team, she convinces her dad to coach a new pee-wee team of their own.

At first, Danny is reluctant to do so, but later accepts in an attempt to show Urbana that Kevin is not invincible, and that there is another O'Shea in town capable of winning. Kevin mockingly reminds him of the "one town, one team" rule enforced by the pee-wee football League, and with the support of the locals, they decide to have a playoff game to determine the lone team that will represent Urbana. Alongside Becky, Hanon, Tad, Rudy, and Nubie (an intelligent boy who becomes assistant coach), Danny also gathers other children that have never been given a chance and dubs the team the "Little Giants." One such player is Junior Floyd, a strong-armed quarterback who turns out to be the son of Danny's childhood crush, Patty Floyd. Becky slowly develops a crush on him and struggles with her newfound feelings as a young woman.

Two local old-timers, Orville and Wilbur, encourage the rivalry between Danny and Kevin, reporting to them that a new star player, Spike Hammersmith, has just moved to Urbana. Danny succeeds at recruiting him by tricking his overzealous father, Mike, into believing he is the famous "Coach O'Shea", but Spike proves to be rude and arrogant, and he refuses to play on a team with a girl. The deception is later discovered and he switches over to Kevin's more well-structured team. Kevin also encourages his daughter, Debbie, to become a cheerleader and later tells Becky that a quarterback will want to date a cheerleader, not a teammate. Believing it is her best chance to win over Junior and feeling exploited as her father's best player, she decides to quit the Giants and pursue cheerleading.

Just as Danny's team start to lose hope, a bus arrives carrying NFL stars John Madden, Emmitt Smith, Bruce Smith, Tim Brown, and Steve Emtman. They teach the kids about football and inspire them to believe they can win.

On the day of the game, Kevin goads Danny into making an impulsive bet: If Danny wins, he gets Kevin's Chevrolet dealership; if Kevin wins, he gets Danny's gas station. Facing a 21-point halftime deficit, the Giants' spirits are lifted when Danny gives them a speech, inspiring them to each remember a time when they had a unique accomplishment. He reassures them that they only need to beat the Cowboys one time to prove themselves. With this, they begin to make a big comeback with a series of outstanding and unexpected plays. Realizing that Junior is the main threat to the Cowboys, Mike Hammersmith orders Spike to take Junior out of the game; Spike injures Junior by spearing him with his helmet after the whistle, an act which angers even Kevin who considers it a dirty and disgusting play, and tells Hammersmith that he will not tolerate such disgraceful conduct from his players.

Witnessing the attack on Junior from the sidelines, an enraged Becky drops her pompoms and suits up for the game. She immediately makes an impact when she forces a fumble after a jarring hit on Spike. Other Giants make touchdowns while overcoming personal demons, such as Hanon's fear of dropping passes and making a reception, or Johnny running towards the end zone in excitement when he sees his little-seen father has rushed back from a business trip to watch him play. In the game's closing seconds with the score tied at 21, the Giants make a goal line stand when Becky stops Spike. With time remaining for one final play, their offense steps back onto the field and uses a trick play Nubie calls "The Annexation of Puerto Rico," inspired by Tom Osborne's famous “fumblerooski”. Kevin shouts out its actual name as it occurs, shouting "Fumblerooski, Fumblerooski!" The play includes three different ball carriers, utilizing the hook and lateral from Zolteck, to Junior, and finally to Berman, who scores the Giants' 99 yard game-winning touchdown.

Afterwards, Danny suggests that rather than having the Giants solely represent Urbana, they should merge with the Cowboys, so that both he and Kevin can coach the team. Danny and Patty rekindle their childhood romance. He also decides not to hold Kevin to the prior bet, on the stipulation that the town water tower be changed from "Home of Kevin O'Shea" to "Home of The O'Shea Brothers," reflecting a much earlier promise that Kevin made to Danny from their childhood.

Cast

Rick Moranis - Danny O'Shea
 Justin Jon Ross as Young Danny 
Ed O'Neill - Kevin O'Shea
Travis Robertson as Young Kevin 
Shawna Waldron - Becky "Icebox" O'Shea
Susanna Thompson - Patty Floyd
 Janna Michaels as Young Patty 
Devon Sawa - Junior Floyd
Brian Haley - Mike Hammersmith
Sam Horrigan - Spike Hammersmith 
Joe Bays - Coach Harold Butz
 Austin Kottke as Young Butz 
Frank Carl Fisher Jr. - Billy Patterson
Mary Ellen Trainor - Karen O'Shea
Courtney Peldon - Debbie O'Shea
Alexa Vega - Priscilla O'Shea
Danny Pritchett - Tad Simpson
Todd Bosley - Jake Berman
Mark Holton - Mr. Zolteck
Mathew McCurley - Nubie
Joey Simmirin - Sean Murphy
Jon Paul Steuer - Johnny "Viper" Vennaro
Troy Simmons - Rashid "Hot Hands" Hanon
Marcus Toji - Marcus "The Toe"
Pat Crawford Brown - Louise
Harry Shearer - Announcer Cliff Parsons	
Mike Zwiener - Rudy Zolteck

Production
The film was inspired by a 1992 McDonald's Super Bowl commercial developed by Jim Ferguson and Bob Shallcross. According to The Baltimore Sun, after seeing the commercial, Steven Spielberg contacted them and said, "I want that commercial made into a movie. I want my 'Home Alone.'"

Reception
The film received mixed reviews. Stephen Holden remarked, in The New York Times, that "anyone who was ever rejected or picked last for a team can relate to the concept behind "Little Giants," a slickly contrived family movie about an inept junior football team that succeeds in spite of spectacular liabilities [...]"Little Giants," which was directed by Duwayne Dunham, devotes much of its energy to such comic antics as balls getting stuck into face masks, and wispy little kids practicing looking intimidating." Hal Hinson of The Washington Post stated that "if "Little Giants" were in a beauty pageant it might win votes for Miss Congeniality, but it definitely wouldn't take the crown." Conversely, the Los Angeles Times suggested that the film was "smarter than many of its ilk. Clearly a great deal of care and thought has gone into making special a picture that could so easily have been routine family fare." On Rotten Tomatoes, the film currently holds a 36% approval rating with a 4.8/10 average rating, based on 11 reviews.

Box office
The film had a budget of $20 million and failed to recoup it, with a total of $19.3 million in box office returns, making it a box office disappointment.

Year-end lists
 Top 10 worst disasters (Ranked #1 in Top 100 Harshest Defense-On-Defense Insults)

Cultural references 
In a 2010 NCAA football game, Michigan State defeated Notre Dame on a fake field goal touchdown pass in overtime to end the game. Head coach Mark Dantonio said the play was called "Little Giants".

The uniforms worn by the Cowboys in the film were the same ones worn by the Dallas Cowboys during the 1994 season as part of the NFL's 75th anniversary. From 2004 to 2007, the New York Giants' alternate jerseys were red with white numerals, similar to the jerseys worn by the Little Giants in the movie.

Home media
On February 7, 1995, Warner Home Video released Little Giants on VHS and LaserDisc. The VHS tape includes a Merrie Melodies cartoon, One Froggy Evening, celebrating the 40th anniversary of Michigan J. Frog. On July 8, 2003, the film was released on DVD.  On March 29, 2011, the film was re-released in a four pack: 4 Film Favorites: Kids Sports (along with Little Big League, Surf Ninjas, and Hometown Legend).

References

External links 

 
 
 

1994 films
1990s sports comedy films
1994 comedy films
1990s children's comedy films
American football films
American children's comedy films
American sports comedy films
Amblin Entertainment films
Warner Bros. films
1990s English-language films
Films directed by Duwayne Dunham
Films shot in Ohio
Films set in Ohio
Films scored by John Debney
Films with screenplays by Tommy Swerdlow
1990s American films